Confessions of a Broken Man is a studio album by country music singer Porter Wagoner. It was released in 1966 by RCA Victor (catalog no. LPM-3593).

The album debuted on Billboard magazine's Top Country Albums chart on October 8, 1966, peaked at No. 6, and remained on the chart for a total of 17 weeks. The album included the No. 3 hit, "Skid Row Joe".

AllMusic gave the album a rating of four-and-a-half stars.

Track listing
Side A
 "Men with Broken Hearts" (Hank Williams)
 "I Just Came to Smell the Flowers" (Vic McAlpin)
 "May You Never Be Alone" (Hank Williams)
 "Skid Row Joe" (Freddie Hart)
 "Take Me Back and Try Me One More Time" (Ernest Tubb)
 "How Far Down Can I Go" (Howard, Barney)

Side B
 "I'm a Long Way from Home" (Hank Cochran)
 "Confessions of a Broken Man" (Bill Anderson)
 "My Tears Are Overdue" (Freddie Hart)
 "I've Been Down That Road Before" (Hank Williams)
 "Thy Burdens Are Greater Than Mine" (Pee Wee King)
 "My Last Two Tens" (Vic McAlpin)

References

1966 albums
Porter Wagoner albums
RCA Victor albums